One Day as a Lion was an alternative rock supergroup that was started in 2008 by Zack de la Rocha, the vocalist of Rage Against the Machine, and Jon Theodore, former drummer of The Mars Volta and current drummer of Queens of the Stone Age. The duo blended elements of rock and hip hop. One Day as a Lion released their eponymous debut EP in July 2008 on the Anti- label.
The band's name comes from a quote by Benito Mussolini

History
Zack de la Rocha had known Jon Theodore for several years before the band was formed and was very impressed with his skills as a drummer, comparing him to John Bonham and Elvin Jones. The duo first started playing together at a mutual friends rehearsal room with Theodore on drums and de la Rocha playing an old Rhodes Mark 1 keyboard through a delay pedal and an old metal amplifier. The band had soon written a number of songs and signed with Bad Religion guitarist and co-founder Brett Gurewitz's record label ANTI-.

On July 16, 2008, the song "Wild International" was made available to stream on the band's MySpace profile and was given its Australian radio premiere by Triple J and American radio premiere by KROQ. The band's eponymous debut EP was released on July 18, 2008, on the Anti-label in Australia and four days later in the US, and was also released on iTunes. The vinyl version was released on October 7, 2008. The EP placed as the 28 album of the week, selling 17,000 copies in its first week. The album has sold extremely well for a five track EP.

On August 11, 2008, de la Rocha spoke to the Los Angeles Times about the new project, his first interview in over eight years. He revealed that a full-length album was scheduled for an Autumn 2008 release, and stated that they "want to play shows and be a band and go out and start some noise". He also mentions adding members to the group, revealing "We're still in the process of forming as a band - we need a keyboard player, I'm not good enough to do it all myself - so that will be rectified soon". The full length album has yet to come out.

On June 1, 2010, One Day as a Lion announced that they would play their first festival show at the Fuji Rock Festival in July via MySpace. On July 17 and 18, the band performed live for the first time in Pomona, California, with Joey Karam of The Locust on keys.

During their Australian tour in January 2011, One Day as a Lion dedicated 100% of their Melbourne show's proceeds to the Queensland flood relief. In an interview that same month, drummer Jon Theodore confirmed the official addition of Joey Karam to the band, and that a second release was in the works.

Members

Zack de la Rocha – vocals, keyboards
Jon Theodore – drums, percussion
Joey Karam – keyboards, organ

Discography

Extended plays

Singles

References

External links

American musical duos
Hip hop duos
Hip hop groups from California
Rage Against the Machine
Rap rock groups
American supergroups
Musical groups established in 2008
Anti- (record label) artists